Buray Hoşsöz (born 15 June 1984) is a Turkish Cypriot pop singer.

Career 
The lead single for Buray's debut album 1 Şişe Aşk was "İstersen." The lyrics were written by Gözde Ançel, and it was composed and arranged by Buray himself. Over time, the song gained traction and saw increased airplay on radio and digital platforms. The song peaked at number one on the Türkçe Top 20. The second music video was released for the song "Sen Sevda Mısın" which also went on to top Turkey's official music charts. This was followed by the music video for the song "Kimsenin Suçu Yok".

Later on Buray released two more albums: Sahiden in 2016 and Kehanet in 2018 with further hits including "Aşk mı Lazım", "Aşk Bitsin", "Deli Divane" and "Kabahat Bende".

Discography 

Throughout his career he has released four studio albums and two remix albums.

Albums

Studio albums

Remix albums

Singles 
 "Hayat Sürer" (2014)
 "Ben Ölmeden Önce" (with Emrah Karaduman) (2019)
 "Aşka Extra'nı Kat" (2019)
 "Rampapapam" (with Feride Hilal Akın & KÖK$VL) (2020)
 "Deli Kız" (2020)
 "Aşk Ne Güzel Şey" (with Erkin Arslan & Evrencan Gündüz) (2020)
 "Senin Yüzünden" (with Arem Özgüç & Arman Aydın) (2020)
 "Çift Gökkuşağı" (Ada Masalı Soundtrack) (2021)
 "1938" (with Erkin Arslan)
 "Deals with the Devil" (with Ilkay Sencan) (2022)
 "Aşk Yeniden" (Yeni Türkü Zamansız) (2022)
 "Kara Gözlüm" (with Emrah Karaduman) (2022)
 "Yangın Var" (with Arem Özgüç & Arman Aydın) (2022)
 "Girdap" (2022)
 "Here Comes the Dawn" (with Erk Emindayı) (2022)
 "Yok Mu?" (2022)
 "Self Control" (2023)
 "Beni Affet" (with Ceren Gündoğdu) (2023)

Music videos

Charts

References

External links 
 

1984 births
Living people
Turkish Cypriot singers
People from North Nicosia
Cypriot pop singers
Turkish lyricists